Belém is a settlement in the eastern part of the island of São Nicolau, Cape Verde. It is situated 9 km east of Ribeira Brava.

See also
List of villages and settlements in Cape Verde

References

Villages and settlements in São Nicolau, Cape Verde